Nimoreni is a village in Ialoveni District, Moldova.

Notable people 
 Gurie Grosu

References

Villages of Ialoveni District